Milovaig, comprises two small scattered, mixed crofting and residential townships, consisting of Lower Milovaig to the North and Upper Milovaig to the South, situated on the south shore of Loch Pooltiel on the Duirinish peninsula, on the Isle of Skye, in the Highlands of Scotland. It is in the Scottish council area of Highland.

It is part of the Glendale estate. The township of Lower Milovaig is divided into 17 crofts, each with a full share in Glendale Estate and a share of the  township common grazings. The souming for each full holding is 3 cows, with calves, and 11 sheep. The township of Upper Milovaig is divided into 16 crofts, each with a full share in Glendale Estate and a share of the  township common grazings. The souming for each holding is 2 cows, 1 two-year-old and 15 sheep.

Gallery

References

Populated places in the Isle of Skye